Eightercua ) is a four-stone alignment (stone-row) Megalithic tomb, located 1.5 km south-south-east of Waterville, County Kerry, Ireland. The tallest stone reaches 9 feet in height, and the alignment streaches for twenty five feet in an east-west direction. Surrounding artifacts, including remains of a possible tomb and an ancient enclosure, suggest that the site had a ritual purpose at one time. Eightercua is thought to originate from circa. 1700 BC, and by tradition is the burial place of Scéine, wife of the leader of the Milesian invaders, Amergin mac Míled.

The site features four tall slabs from 1.8m to 3m high running east and west. From one stone a slab runs south and could be part of a tomb chamber or cist set in an oval cairn 1m high.

References

External links
 Images of Eightercua

Megalithic monuments in Ireland
Archaeological sites in County Kerry
Tombs in the Republic of Ireland